William Rush may refer to:
William Rush (sculptor) (1756–1833), American sculptor
William R. Rush (1857–1940), American naval officer and Medal of Honor recipient
USS William R. Rush
William Rush (politician) (1919–2000), American politician
William Rush (actor) (born 1994), English actor
Billy Rush (William Rush, born 1952), American musician

See also